The 6th General Junta was the meeting of the General Junta, the parliament of the Principality of Asturias, with the membership determined by the results of the regional election held on 25 May 2003. The congress met for the first time on 17 June 2003.

Election 
The 6th Asturian regional election was held on 25 May 2003. At the election the Spanish Socialist Workers' Party (PSOE) remained the largest party in the General Junta but fell short of a majority after losing 2 seats.

History 
The new parliament met for the first time on 17 June 2003. María Jesús Álvarez (PSOE) was elected as the president of the General Junta, with the support of PSOE and IU-BA-LV.

Deaths, resignations and suspensions 
The 6th General Junta has seen the following deaths, resignations and suspensions:

 4 September 2003 - Juana María González (PSOE) resigned. She was replaced by Ruben Almeida (PSOE) on 24 September 2003.
 25 March 2004 - Maria Luisa Carcedo (PSOE) resigned after being elected member of the Congress of Deputies in the 2004 general elections. Manuel Alfredo Pérez (PSOE) replaced her on 1 April 2004.
 29 October 2006 - Manuel Alfredo Pérez (PSOE) passed away. He was replaced by María Azucena Cotos (PSOE).

Members

References

External links 

 Official website of the General Junta
 All members of the General Junta

General Junta of the Principality of Asturias